Two thirds of the Greek people live in urban areas. Greece's largest metropolitan centers and most influential urban areas are those of Athens and Thessaloniki, with metropolitan populations of approximately four million and one million inhabitants respectively. The third-largest-city is Patras, with a metropolitan area of 273,984 inhabitants. The table below, using the Publication of Revised 2011 Census Tables about the final population, lists the largest cities in Greece, by population size and staff of 750.

Census-designated places

The lowest level of census-designated places in Greece are called oikismoi (settlements) and are the smallest continuous built-up areas with a toponym designated for the census. Although some urban CDPs form individual cities and towns (labeled in bold) the majority of them do not. They are either what make up the central districts, or suburbs (italicized), contained within the wider urban and metropolitan areas of Athens and Thessaloniki.

The list below presents every settlement (CDP) that is urban, with a population of more than 10,000 de jure (permanent) residents, using data collected from the 2011 census.

Explanation of the superscript numbers:
1 a suburb of the Athens urban area, in Athens’ agglomeration/conurbation 
2 a suburb of the Thessaloniki urban area, in Thessaloniki’s agglomeration/conurbation 
3 a suburb that belongs to Piraeus regional unit (Greater Piraeus), which is part of the Athens urban area.
4 a suburb of Athens' metropolitan area
5 a suburb of Thessaloniki's metropolitan area
6 a municipal unit of the Volos urban area, in Volos' agglomeration/conurbation
7 a municipal unit of the Heraklion urban area, in Heraklion's agglomeration/conurbation.
8 the core unit of Patras agglomeration/conurbation with population of 273,984
* The settlement (CDP) of Athens is the central district of the Athens urban area.
* The settlement (CDP) of Thessaloniki is the central district of the Thessaloniki urban area.

See also
Alphabetical list of municipalities and communities in Greece
List of ancient Greek cities
List of cities
List of cities in Europe

References

External links
 
 Greek city guides

Greece

Cities
Greece

de:Liste der Gemeinden Griechenlands